Kim Bo-ra (Korean: 김보라, born September 28, 1995) is a South Korean actress. She gained recognition for her role in the hit drama Sky Castle (2018). She started her career as a child when she was in the film For Horowitz (2006), and has since been in the dramas and films Jungle Fish 2 (2010), Bel Ami (2013), Glamorous Temptation (2015), and others.

Other appearances
In 2019, she appeared on the television commercial for Koreaglow, a beauty soap from Unilever.

Filmography

Film

Television series

Web series

Music video appearances

Discography

Ambassadorship

Awards and nominations

References

External links 

 
 
 
Kim Bo-ra on Instagram
Kim Bo-ra on Naver Blog

1995 births
Living people
Inha University alumni
21st-century South Korean actresses
South Korean child actresses
South Korean television actresses
South Korean film actresses